The 13th BARC "200" was a motor race, run to Formula One rules, held on 19 April 1958 at the Aintree Circuit, England. The race was run over 67 laps of the circuit, and was won by British driver Stirling Moss in a Cooper T45.

The field also included many Formula Two cars, highest finisher being Tony Brooks who took third place in a Cooper T43.

Results 
''Note: a blue background indicates a car running under Formula 2 regulations.

References 

BARC "200"
BARC
BARC Aintree 200